Geojehaemaji station is a railway station of the Donghae Line in Geoje-dong, Yeonje District, Busan, South Korea. The station is unrelated to the Geoje station of Busan Metro.

Station layout

Gallery

Railway stations in Busan
Railway stations opened in 1940
Yeonje District
1940 establishments in the Japanese colonial empire